Bac Ha International University is a private university north-east of Hanoi, Vietnam. Bac Ha International University  BHIU was established under the Prime Minister's Decision no. 1369/QD-TTg dated October 10, 2007, with the mandate of training human resources in the fields of Information Technology, Telecommunication–Electronics Engineering, Banking and Finance, Accounting.

References

Universities in Vietnam